William John Bremner (9 December 1942 – 7 December 1997) was a Scottish professional footballer and manager. Regarded as one of the game's great midfielders, he combined precision passing skills with tenacious tackling and physical stamina. He played for Leeds United from 1959 to 1976, serving as captain from 1965, in one of the most successful periods in the club's history. 

At Leeds, Bremner won the First Division (1968–69 and 1973–74), Second Division (1963–64), Inter-Cities Fairs Cup (1968 and 1971), FA Cup (1972), League Cup (1968) and FA Charity Shield (1969). The club also finished second in numerous competitions, being runners-up five times in the English league and seven times in cup finals, including the 1975 European Cup. He was also named as the FWA Footballer of the Year in 1970 and was listed on the PFA Team of the Year in 1973–74. He has since been voted Leeds United's greatest player of all time and has a statue outside the south-east corner of their Elland Road stadium. He has also been included in the Football League 100 Legends and is a member of both the English Football Hall of Fame and Scottish Football Hall of Fame.

Bremner played for Hull City from 1976 to 1978, before being appointed player-manager at Doncaster Rovers in November 1978. He spent seven years as Doncaster manager, guiding the club to promotion out of the Fourth Division in 1980–81 and 1983–84, before he took on the manager's job at Leeds United in October 1985. He failed to gain promotion to the top flight and left the club in September 1988. He returned to Doncaster in July 1989, ending his second spell in charge in November 1991.

Bremner is on the Scotland national football team roll of honour for having won more than 50 caps for Scotland. He captained his country at the 1974 FIFA World Cup, where Scotland failed to advance from the group stage despite being unbeaten in the competition.

Club career

Leeds United
Born in Stirling, Stirlingshire, Scotland, to James and Bridget Bremner, he attended St Modan's High School and represented Scotland Schoolboys. His father forbade him from joining Celtic as he did not want him involved in the religion-based rivalry with Rangers, and Bremner rejected both Arsenal and Chelsea as he did not enjoy his stay in London during trial spells with the two clubs, and was instead convinced to join Bill Lambton's Leeds United in 1959. He joined along with his friend Tommy Henderson, who would return to Scotland due to homesickness without making a first team debut. Manager Jack Taylor gave him his debut at outside-right in a 3–1 win against Chelsea at Stamford Bridge, at the age of 17 years and 47 days; Yorkshire Evening Post reporter Phil Brown noted that Bremner showed "enthusiasm, guts, intelligence, most accurate use of the ball and unselfishness" despite poor weather conditions. A The Sunday Times headline later dubbed him as "10st of barbed wire" due to his tenacity and tough tackling. Regular outside-right Chris Crowe was sold to Blackburn Rovers in March 1960, allowing Bremner to take his place on a permanent basis. However, Leeds went on to be relegated from the First Division at the end of the 1959–60 season.

Dropped following an opening day defeat by Liverpool at Anfield, Bremner had to win back his first team place later in the 1960–61 season after meeting with Jack Taylor to explain his frustration at being left out of the team. Taylor resigned in March 1961, and player Don Revie was promoted to manager. Revie rejected an approach of £25,000 from Hibernian for Bremner, despite the player wanting to return to Scotland to be with his fiancée. Leeds struggled in the 1961–62 campaign, finishing just three points above the Second Division relegation zone, despite 12 goals in 45 appearances from Bremner, who finished as the club's joint top-scorer alongside centre-half Jack Charlton. One bright spot was the signing of Bobby Collins in March, who helped form the "win-at-all-costs" attitude that defined Leeds and Bremner throughout the rest of Revie's 13 years as manager.

United had a more promising 1962–63 campaign, finishing four points shy of promotion, though Bremner was limited to 24 appearances. He was out of form and dropped from the first team during the end of season run-in, which contained a disproportionately large number of games due to the high level of postponements that occurred during the harsh winter. Revie moved Bremner to central midfield, and bought Manchester United's Johnny Giles to create what would prove to be one of the most highly effective central midfield partnerships of the next 12 years. With Bremner, Collins and Giles in midfield, Leeds went on to win promotion as champions in the 1963–64 season. The club won no friends in doing so however, and the following summer were labelled by the Football Association's own FA News as "the dirtiest [team] in the Football League. In November of the 1964–65 season Bremner featured heavily in a win at Everton that was marred by violent clashes on the pitch, the game was stopped for a short spell ten minutes before half-time as the referee felt that a spell of cooling down was needed to prevent further violence; despite the referee only giving 12 Leeds fouls to Everton's 19 the match helped to cement United's reputation as a dirty and overly physical team. A run of victories put the club top by the new year, however they lost the title on goal average to Manchester United after drawing the last game of the season with already-relegated Birmingham City. The Manchester club would become a keen rival, one which intensified after Leeds knocked them out of the FA Cup at the semi-finals after two physical encounters. Leeds faced Liverpool in the final at Wembley, and the game went to extra-time after a 0–0 draw; Bremner scored a half-volley in the 100th minute to cancel out Roger Hunt's opener, but Ian St John won the game for Liverpool in the 113th minute.

In October 1965, Leeds skipper Collins was injured in an Inter-Cities Fairs Cup game against Torino and Revie gave the captaincy to Bremner after initially handing the armband to Charlton for the remainder of the season; Charlton was keen to give up the captaincy as it prevented his superstitious ritual of coming out of the tunnel last on match days. Revie and Bremner had a strong bond of trust, which was why the manager gave him the captaincy at such a young age. Leeds finished second in the league in the 1965–66 campaign to Liverpool, who had finished six points clear at the top.

A poor start to the 1966–67 season prevented another push for the title, and Leeds eventually finished in fourth place. They made it to the FA Cup semi-finals, before Chelsea knocked them out with a 1–0 win. In Europe they beat DWS (Netherlands), Valencia (Spain), Bologna (Italy) and Kilmarnock (Scotland) to reach the Inter-Cities Fairs Cup final against Dinamo Zagreb (Yugoslavia); Zagreb won 2–0 at the Stadion Maksimir and held Leeds to a 0–0 draw at Elland Road to leave Leeds with another second-place finish.

The club had a slow start to the 1967–68 season but soon picked up, particularly so with a 7–0 victory over Chelsea, though for the second successive season they ended up in fourth spot. Success instead came from the cup competitions, as they first knocked out Luton Town, Bury, Sunderland, Stoke City and Derby County in the League Cup en route to the final against Arsenal at Wembley; Leeds won the game 1–0 in a dour defensive manner but striker Jimmy Greenhoff later said it was the most memorable of the club's trophies due to it being the first such success. The second soon followed, despite a disappointment of exiting the FA Cup at the semi-final stage with defeat by Everton, as they reached the final of the Inter-Cities Fairs Cup by beating CA Spora (Luxembourg), FK Partizan (Yugoslavia), Hibernian (Scotland), Rangers (Scotland), and Dundee (Scotland). They beat Ferencvárosi (Hungary) 1–0 at Elland Road and held them to a 0–0 draw at Népstadion to win the club's first European trophy.

Revie targeted the title for the 1968–69 campaign and played Bremner in every league game as Leeds finished six points clear at the top to become champions of England for the first time. The title was secured with a 0–0 draw with title rivals Liverpool at Anfield on 28 April, after which Bremner led the players to applaud the Liverpool fans who responded by chanting "Champions, Champions, Champions ...". Leeds set a number of records: most points (67), most wins (27), fewest defeats (2), and most home points (39). A still-unbroken club record is their 34 match unbeaten run that extended into the following season.

The 1969–70 season opened with victory in the 1969 FA Charity Shield, as Bremner captained Leeds to a 2–1 victory over Manchester City. With new arrival Allan Clarke played upfront alongside Mick Jones and Peter Lorimer Revie had to instruct Bremner and Giles to resist the temptation to get forward and attack. It took the team some time to gel, as only two wins came from the opening eight league games, and Leeds eventually finished a distant second to champions Everton. They chased Everton all season only to give up on the title after a home defeat by Southampton late in the campaign. In the European Cup Leeds recorded a club record 10–0 win over Norwegian side Lyn, with Bremner netting two of the goals. However they exited the competition at the semi-final stage after two defeats to Celtic; Bremner levelled the aggregate score by putting United 1–0 ahead in front of a competition record 136,505 spectators at Hampden Park, but Celtic came back to win the game and the tie with two second half goals. Further disappointment came in the 1970 FA Cup Final, where Leeds were beaten 2–1 by Chelsea in extra-time of the replay at Old Trafford. Bremner was named as FWA Footballer of the Year for the season.

The league title in the 1970–71 season was decided in mid-April in front of the Match of the Day cameras at Elland Road, when Leeds lost their lead at the top with defeat by West Bromwich Albion. The Leeds players blamed the referee for costing them the title as offside was not given for Colin Suggett for Jeff Astle's winner, and despite Bremner saying "But we fight on. Make no mistake about that, it is not over yet" Leeds could not overtake Arsenal, who went on to win the Double. Success instead came in the Inter-Cities Fairs Cup, as Leeds knocked out Sarpsborg (Norway), Dynamo Dresden (East Germany), Sparta Prague (Czechoslovakia), Vitória (Portugal) and Liverpool to reach the final with Juventus (Italy). Bremner recovered from an ankle injury just in time to face Liverpool in the semi-finals, and scored the only goal of the two-legged tie with a header at Anfield. Leeds won the final on the away goals rule after recording a 2–2 draw at the Stadio Olimpico di Torino and then a 1–1 draw at Elland Road.

Leeds finished second in the league for the third successive season in the 1971–72 campaign, despite playing some of the best football in the club's history. They knocked out Bristol Rovers, Liverpool, Cardiff City, Tottenham Hotspur and Birmingham City to reach the 1972 FA Cup Final with Arsenal; they then won the trophy for the first time in the club's history with Allan Clarke scoring the final's only goal. Two days after the final Leeds could have secured the Double by winning a point against Wolverhampton Wanderers at Molineux, but a 2–1 defeat handed the title to Derby County. On 3 February 1982, Bremner won £100,000 libel damages, along with legal costs, after he sued the Sunday People newspaper for publishing an article on 11 September 1977 that alleged he tried to fix football matches, including the May 1972 game at Wolves. Bremner donated the damages to a Leeds Hospice.

The title was nowhere near as close in the 1972–73 season, which saw Leeds finish third, seven points behind Liverpool. However more runners-up medals came from the FA Cup and the European Cup Winners' Cup. After Bremner scored the only goal of the semi-final clash with Wolves, Leeds went on to lose the FA Cup final 1–0 to Second Division Sunderland. They were then beaten 1–0 by Italian side A.C. Milan at the Kaftanzoglio Stadium in the European Cup Winners' Cup Final, though Bremner missed the final due to suspension.

Revie instructed Bremner to be more attacking in the 1973–74 campaign, and the result was 11 goals in 52 appearances, his biggest goal tally in 12 years. The manager focused entirely on the league and told his team the aim was to go the season unbeaten, and although they lost three games they secured a second league title by a five-point margin on second-place Liverpool. Bremner was named on the PFA Team of the Year and finished second in the FWA Footballer of the Year voting to Ian Callaghan. At the end of the season he was given a testimonial match against Sunderland which raised him £32,500; he had chosen the opponents in an attempt to avenge defeat in the previous year's FA Cup final.

Manager Don Revie took the England management job in July 1974. Bremner applied for the vacant Leeds job after Johnny Giles had been named by Revie as his successor, but instead the board surprised everyone by appointing Brian Clough, who went on to a disastrous 44-day spell in charge of Leeds at the start of the 1974–75 season. Revie's departure was tough for Bremner, who had a strong bond with his manager. Leeds lost the 1974 FA Charity Shield in a penalty shoot-out to Liverpool, but more significantly Bremner and Kevin Keegan were sent off for fighting and received eleven game suspensions. By the time Bremner was allowed to play again Jimmy Armfield was the manager, though he refuted the accusation that he had attempted to undermine Clough as "ridiculous". Teammate Peter Lorimer insisted that the only criticism he had of Bremner was in applying for the management job against Giles, which had caused to board to look elsewhere for fear of dividing the dressing room by choosing between Bremner and Giles. Results improved with Bremner back in the side, and though they ended the season in ninth place, they were only eight points behind champions Derby. The club's biggest aim would be success in the European Cup, and they made it to the final after knocking out FC Zürich (Switzerland), Újpest FC (Hungary), Anderlecht (Belgium), and Barcelona (Spain). Their final opponents at Parc des Princes were defending champions Bayern Munich (Germany), who beat Leeds 2–0; United had a goal controversially ruled out for offside and the tie ended in rioting by United fans.

With most of the Revie built team retiring or moving on to other clubs, Armfield had to rebuild the squad, though Bremner would still play 38 games in the 1975–76 campaign. However, he missed a lengthy spell in the new year due to injury and results dipped during this time and ultimately ended the club's title hopes; they went on to end the campaign in fifth spot.

Hull City
Bremner signed with Hull City for a £25,000 fee on 23 September 1976, manager John Kaye feeling that Bremner's experience would benefit his youthful Second Division side. His debut at Boothferry Park came against Brian Clough's Nottingham Forest, and Bremner was credited with scoring the winning goal of the game with a free-kick, though it seemed to have gone in with a significant deflection. Despite the good start results dipped midway through the 1976–77 season and the "Tigers" ended the season in 14th place. Despite suffering with a back injury Bremner was appointed as captain and played 32 games.

He missed the 1977–78 pre-season with a knee injury, but recovered well enough to make 36 appearances throughout the campaign. Kaye was sacked after a poor start to the season, and was replaced by Bremner's former Leeds teammate Bobby Collins, who had joined the club as assistant manager in the summer; as at Leeds, Bremner had applied for the vacant managerial role, but was rejected. After being turned down for the job he announced his intention to retire as a player at the end of his contract in June 1978. The season was a disaster, and though Collins was sacked and replaced by youth coach Ken Houghton in February, results did not improve and Hull were relegated in last place, ten points from safety.

International career
Bremner was well established in the Scotland set-up, playing in a trial match against the Scottish Football League XI and winning four under-23 caps, before he made his senior debut for Scotland in May 1965, in a 0–0 draw with Spain at Hampden Park. He went on to feature in qualifying games for the 1966 FIFA World Cup, but defeats to Poland and Italy left Scotland second in their group, which was not enough to qualify. He also played in friendlies against Brazil and Portugal, and received a black eye from Pelé's elbow in a clash during a high ball; despite this being an accident it still demonstrated to Bremner how he had failed to intimidate Pelé as he had done to many other great players of the day.

The England–Scotland football rivalry was intense throughout his playing career, and so great media attention came upon Bremner and the rest of the Scottish players after they beat world champions England 3–2 at Wembley to become the "unofficial world champions" on 15 April 1967. Many teammates said that Bremner held this match as one of the proudest moments of his career.

Placed in a tough group for qualification to the 1970 FIFA World Cup, Scotland failed to qualify after finishing in second place. Bremner captained his country throughout the process, having first taken up the armband in a friendly defeat by Denmark in Copenhagen. He scored his first international goal in a 2–1 qualifying victory over Austria at Hampden Park, his first game as captain. This game was followed by two victories over Cyprus and a 1–1 draw with West Germany, however a 3–2 defeat by West Germany in Hamburg ended their hopes of making it to the World Cup. Bremner's second international goal came in a 3–2 win over Wales in a British Home Championship game at the Racecourse Ground.

Scotland were the only home nation to qualify for the 1974 FIFA World Cup after finishing ahead of Czechoslovakia and Denmark in their group. However, Bremner was nearly not selected by manager Willie Ormond after Ormond found him drunk in a bar not long after Jimmy Johnstone had to be rescued by the coastguard having gotten stranded in a rowing boat during a night out following a home international match against Northern Ireland. Having been selected, Bremner captained Scotland to a 2–0 win over Zaire at the Westfalenstadion. He was later accused by Zairian player Ndaye Mulamba of racially abusing him during this match, as well as spitting at Mulamba and Mana Mamuwene. A highly creditable 0–0 draw against world champions Brazil left Scotland with high hopes of qualifying to the second round. Yet a 1–1 draw with Yugoslavia sent Scotland out of the competition unbeaten due to Brazil and Yugoslavia finishing level on points but with superior goal difference.

Bremner's last cap came against Denmark on 3 September 1975. An incident in Copenhagen after the game where several players were ejected from a nightclub for an alleged fight led to a lifetime ban from international football by the Scottish Football Association; four other players, Willie Young, Joe Harper, Pat McCluskey and Arthur Graham also were banned for life (Graham and Harper later had their bans overturned). Bremner maintained his innocence, stating that the incident had been blown out of proportion by the SFA.

Management career

Doncaster Rovers
Bremner was appointed manager of struggling Fourth Division side Doncaster Rovers in November 1978. He oversaw a 1–0 win over Rochdale at Belle Vue in his first match in charge. Results fluctuated during the 1978–79 season, demonstrated by a 7–1 defeat by struggling AFC Bournemouth punctuating a run of five wins in six games. Rovers ended the season in 22nd place, though 11 points ahead of Halifax Town and Crewe Alexandra, and successfully applied to the Football League for re-election.

He introduced massages and changed the canteen and team kit for the 1979–80 campaign. With no money available for transfers he was forced to turn to the youth team for new players, though he could afford to take on Ian Nimmo, Hugh Dowd, John Dowie and Billy Russell on free transfers. He appointed former Leeds coach Les Cocker as his assistant. The season started poorly, but the squad bonded following Cocker's death on 4 October and went on a run of six straight wins, for which Bremner was credited with the Fourth Division Manager of the Month award. However a run of just one win in 15 games followed, for which Bremner blamed his small squad and lack of training facilities. A mounting injury crisis caused him to make a return to playing on 29 March for the visit of Bournemouth, a game in which 16-year-old Ian Snodin was named on the bench. Rovers ended the season in 12th place.

A disappointing opening sequence of the 1980–81 season was followed by six wins in six games in September, and Bremner won his second Manager of the Month award. The good results continued for the rest of the campaign, and Rovers were promoted in third place. He signed Celtic's Colin Douglas for the challenge of Third Division football, but otherwise remained loyal to his promotion squad for the approaching 1981–82 season. Another strong September, six wins seeing the club rise to second in the table, won Bremner the Third Division Manager of the Month award. However a lean spell would follow, and from November to February Doncaster failed to win in the league. Results again picked up with only two defeats in the last 14 games, and they ended the campaign in 19th spot, three points above the relegation zone.

Strong competition promoted from the Fourth Division – Wigan Athletic, Sheffield United and Bradford City – made the 1982–83 campaign a tough prospect. A weak defence saw an unusual sequence of high-scoring matches early in the season: 6–1 win over Exeter City, 7–5 win over Reading, 6–3 defeat by Wigan, and a 4–4 draw with Brentford. Only seven wins from the last 36 games of the season left Doncaster relegated in 23rd place, 16 points behind 20th-place Orient.

To try and win immediate promotion during the 1983–84 season Bremner signed veteran forward Ernie Moss (who had won three promotions out of the division), Andy Kowalski, left-back John Breckin, experienced defender Bill Green, and young midfielder Mark Miller. Investment by new director Peter Wetzel allowed Bremner to spend £120,000 on three players in March: £60,000 on Stirling Albion defender John Philliben, £25,000 on young Celtic midfielder Jim Dobbin, and £35,000 on Shrewsbury Town defender Alan Brown. Promotion was secured in comfortable fashion, as they finished as runners-up to runaway champions York City, ten points above fifth-place Aldershot.

Building for the 1984–85 campaign, Bremner signed former Leeds striker Aiden Butterworth and winger John Buckley (£25,000 from Partick Thistle). Doncaster won five of their opening seven games, and though they were unable to sustain a promotion push they showed their ability with a 1–0 win over eventual champions Bradford at Valley Parade on Boxing Day and a 1–0 FA Cup win over First Division side Queens Park Rangers on 5 January. Rovers finished the season in 14th place, some distance from the promotion and the relegation places.

To pay for stadium upgrades necessitated by the aftermath of the Bradford City stadium fire Doncaster were forced to sell Ian and Glynn Snodin, who went to Leeds and Sheffield Wednesday and respectively for a total of £315,000. To replace then he bought Dave Rushbury from Gillingham for £10,000 and spent £60,000 on Millwall defender Dave Cusack.

Leeds United manager
Bremner was appointed as Leeds United manager in October 1985, having impressed the boardroom with his work at Doncaster, particularly his negotiation skills during the sale of Ian Snodin; Leeds paid Doncaster £45,000 in compensation. The club had declined during his absence; Leeds had dropped down into the Second Division, sold Elland Road to the council to raise money, and club supporters picked up a reputation for violence after regular hooligan riots in the stands. He quickly reinstated Don Revie's philosophy and his little traditions, for example he reinstated the sessions of carpet bowls on Friday evenings. Despite this he appointed Ian Snodin as club captain, and dropped former captain and teammate Peter Lorimer from the starting line eleven. He also moved on the young players signed by former manager and teammate Eddie Gray, choosing to sign experienced players in their place. Five key young players to leave the club were Scott Sellars (£20,000 to Blackburn Rovers), Terry Phelan (free transfer to Swansea City), Denis Irwin, Tommy Wright and Andy Linighan (all to Oldham Athletic for £60,000, £55,000 and £80,000 respectively). The money raised allowed him to buy central defender Brendan Ormsby (£65,000 from Aston Villa), and also sign David Rennie, Brian Caswell and Ronnie Robinson. Leeds struggled in the 1985–86 season, but managed to steer away from the relegation zone to finish in 14th place.

During the 1986 close season, Bremner spent £125,000 on 29-year-old Sheffield United striker Keith Edwards, and a further £80,000 to bring in 31-year-old Carlisle United defender Jack Ashurst and Newcastle United defender Peter Haddock. Other new arrivals were winger Russell Doig (£15,000 from East Stirlingshire), goalkeeper Ronnie Sinclair (free transfer from Nottingham Forest) and midfielder John Buckley (£35,000 from Doncaster Rovers, having also signed him whilst at Doncaster). Aiming for a promotion push in the 1986–87 campaign, Leeds were stuck in mid-table by February after selling Snodin to Everton for £840,000. This sale though allowed Bremner money for further signings and he took left-back Bobby McDonald from Oxford United, full-back Micky Adams from Coventry City for £110,000, and striker John Pearson and defender Mark Aizlewood from Charlton Athletic for £72,000 and £200,000 respectively. A 2–1 FA Cup Fifth Round victory over First Division side Queens Park Rangers then raised belief in the players, and they qualified for the play-offs by the end of the campaign. The FA Cup run continued into the semi-finals, where they were knocked out 3–2 by Coventry City at Hillsborough in a close-run game that ran into extra-time. After overcoming Oldham in the play-off semi-final their opponents in the play-off final were Charlton Athletic, and after 1–0 home wins in both legs the tie went to a replay at St Andrew's. John Sheridan put Leeds ahead in extra-time of the replay, but two late goals from Peter Shirtliff changed the game and denied Leeds promotion.

Bremner signed a new three-year contract in the 1987 close season. New arrivals at the club were Glynn Snodin (£150,000 from Sheffield Wednesday), winger Gary Williams (£230,000 from Aston Villa) and Bobby Davison (£350,000 from Derby County), as well as Jim Melrose and Ken DeMange. A more significant new face was David Batty, a key player of the future who was given his debut from the youth team. United started the season inconsistently, but five straight wins in December won Bremner the Second Division Manager of the Month award. The inconsistent results returned however, and Leeds finished the 1987–88 season in seventh place, eight points outside the play-offs. Bremner did not enjoy a good relationship with the club's board, who felt him to be uncommunicative with them, and after a poor start to the 1988–89 season he was sacked in September 1988. His successor, Howard Wilkinson, was given money to spend by the board and Leeds went on to win promotion in 1990.

Return to Doncaster Rovers
In July 1989 Bremner went back as manager to Doncaster, who had fallen back into the Fourth Division during his absence. He signed Lincoln City winger John McGinley and Leeds midfielder John Stiles, and led the club to a 20th-place finish in 1989–90, which represented a small improvement on the previous season. Greater success came in the Football League Trophy, Rovers reaching the area finals, where they were beaten by Third Division leaders Tranmere Rovers.

New additions for the 1990–91 campaign were Peterborough United goalkeeper Paul Crichton, Stoke City defender Andy Holmes and Tottenham Hotspur midfielder Eddie Gormley, as well as his former Leeds captain Brendan Ormsby. Rovers were top of the table at the turn of the year, but injuries and lack of form caused results to fall away, as did hopes of promotion, and Doncaster finished the campaign in 11th place. Rovers started the 1991–92 season badly and Bremner tendered his resignation on 2 November, with the club sitting bottom of the Football League.

Personal life
He married Vicky Dick in November 1961. He had a ghost-written column in Shoot throughout the 1970s. After retiring from football in November 1991 he took up work as an after dinner speaker.

At the beginning of December 1997, Bremner was rushed to hospital after suffering from pneumonia, but suffered a suspected heart attack at his Doncaster home in the small village of Clifton and died two days before his 55th birthday. His funeral, attended by many of Bremner's former team-mates and other football players and coaches, was held four days later in the Yorkshire village of New Edlington.

Legacy
A statue by sculptor Frances Segelman of Bremner in celebratory pose was erected outside Elland Road in tribute in 1999. In 1988, the Football League, as part of its centenary season celebrations, included Bremner on its list of 100 League Legends. He was inducted into both the English Football Hall of Fame and the Scottish Football Hall of Fame. He was inducted into the National Football Museum Hall of Fame in 2004, with the acknowledgement that: "his priceless precision passing, stamina and skill led him to become a Leeds United legend and one of the game's greatest midfielders" and that he "was not simply tough but a skilful player with an ability to score in crucial games". In 2006, he was voted Leeds United's greatest player of all time. In September 2013 he was voted as the greatest captain in the Football League's history.

Bremner was portrayed by Stephen Graham in the 2009 biographical drama film The Damned United, directed by Tom Hooper and starring Michael Sheen as Brian Clough.

In late 2021 and early 2022, the University of Stirling began research into Bremner’s life. They have consulted local sources, including former St Modan’s pupils as researchers, which is where Bremner attended high school.

Career statistics

Club

International

Scores and results list Scotland's goal tally first, score column indicates score after each Bremner goal.

Managerial statistics

Honours

As a player
Leeds United
Football League First Division: 1968–69, 1973–74
FA Cup: 1971–72
Football League Cup: 1967–68
FA Charity Shield: 1969
Football League Second Division: 1963–64
Inter-Cities Fairs Cup: 1967–68, 1970–71
European Cup runner-up: 1974–75

Individual
FWA Footballer of the Year: 1970
PFA Team of the Year (First Division): 1973–74
Scotland national football team roll of honour: 1974

As a manager
Doncaster Rovers
Football League Fourth Division third-place promotion: 1980–81
Football League Fourth Division second-place promotion: 1983–84

Individual
Football League Fourth Division Manager of the Month: October 1979, September 1980
Football League Third Division Manager of the Month: September 1981
Football League Second Division Manager of the Month: December 1987

See also
List of footballers in England by number of league appearances (500+)
List of Scotland national football team captains

References
General

Specific

1942 births
1997 deaths
People educated at St Modan's High School
Footballers from Stirling
Scottish footballers
Association football midfielders
Leeds United F.C. players
Hull City A.F.C. players
Doncaster Rovers F.C. players
English Football League players
Scottish Football League representative players
Scotland under-23 international footballers
Scotland international footballers
1974 FIFA World Cup players
English Football Hall of Fame inductees
Scottish Football Hall of Fame inductees
Scottish football managers
Doncaster Rovers F.C. managers
Leeds United F.C. managers
English Football League managers
FA Cup Final players